Fur Jan (also Romanized as Fūr Jān; also known as Qūrjān, Fūrg, and Fūrgu) is a village in Shakhen Rural District, in the Central District of Birjand County, South Khorasan Province, Iran. At the 2016 census, its population was 496, in 161 families.

The 12th century Furg citadel is nearby.

References 

Populated places in Birjand County